The copperstripe barb (Enteromius multilineatus) is a species of cyprinid fish in the genus Enteromius which occurs in central Africa from the Congo Basin to the Zambezi.

References 

 

Enteromius
Cyprinid fish of Africa
Fish described in 1933
Taxa named by E. Barton Worthington